Lennooideae is a subfamily of parasitic flowering plants of southwestern North America and northwestern South America.

The relationships of this subfamily to other plants remain uncertain. It was traditionally treated at family rank as Lennoaceae, and placed in different orders by different authors, including Lamiales (in the Cronquist system) and Solanales (Dahlgren system). More recently, molecular phylogenetic publications grouped it within the clade "Euasterids I", and most recently, it was demoted to a subfamily of the family Boraginaceae in the APG II system.

This subfamily has a disjunct distribution, occurring in Colombia as well as a separate area in southwestern North America, covering parts of California, Arizona and Mexico. It consists of up to three genera, Ammobroma, Lennoa and Pholisma, which among them hold around five species, including the desert Christmas tree, Pholisma arenarium, and sandfood, Pholisma sonorae.

Members of this subfamily are succulent, herbaceous plants with no chlorophyll. The leaves are reduced to short scales, and the plants are entirely parasitic on the roots of their hosts, which are typically Clematis, Euphorbia or various woody Asteraceae.

External links
 Parasitic Plant Connection: Lennoaceae

References

 
Asterid subfamilies
Parasitic plants
Flora of North America
Flora of Colombia